Jana Čepelová (born 29 May 1993) is a Slovak former tennis player.

Čepelová won seven singles and three doubles titles on the ITF Women's Circuit. On 12 May 2014, she reached her best singles ranking of world No. 50. On 18 May 2015, she peaked at No. 158 in the doubles rankings.

Her best result at a major event was the third round of the 2012 and 2016 Wimbledon Championships. As a junior, she won the girls' doubles at the 2010 Australian Open with Chantal Škamlová.

Personal life
Čepelová was born in Košice to Peter and Jarmila and was coached by Martin Zathurecký.

Career

Junior career
Jana Čepelová and Chantal Škamlová won the girls' doubles at 2010 Australian Open. They also won silver medal in doubles at 2010 Summer Youth Olympics. At the same event, Čepelová won the bronze medal in singles.

2012: Coming onto the WTA Tour
Čepelová spent most of her 2012-year on the ITF Circuit. Her best achievement on the WTA Tour was at the Wimbledon Championships. She qualified for the main draw by defeating Alla Kudryavtseva, Chanel Simmonds and Ekaterina Bychkova. In round one, she beat fellow qualifier Kristina Mladenovic in three sets. In the second round, she upset 26th seed Anabel Medina Garrigues before she lost to world No. 2, Victoria Azarenka.

2014: First WTA final
At the Family Circle Cup in Charleston, Čepelová scored the biggest win of her career, defeating world No. 1 Serena Williams in the second round. Čepelová would go on to reach her first WTA tournament final with victories over Elena Vesnina, Daniela Hantuchová, and Belinda Bencic. Her run ended there as she lost to Andrea Petkovic.

2015

Čepelová started the year at the Auckland Open. She lost in the first round to third seed, last year finalist, and eventual champion Venus Williams. At the Hobart International, Čepelová was defeated in the first round by Annika Beck.

Playing at the Indian Wells Open, Čepelová lost in the first round to qualifier Lucie Hradecká. At Miami, she was defeated in the first round by Julia Görges. Seeded second at the Wilde Lexus Women's USTA Pro Circuit Event, Čepelová fell in the first round to Laura Siegemund.

Last year finalist at the Family Circle Cup, Čepelová lost in the second round to fourth seed Sara Errani. At the Prague Open, she was defeated in the first round by Elena Vesnina. Competing at the Slovak Open, Čepelová lost in the first round to Tereza Smitková. Seeded eighth at the Open Saint-Gaudens, she reached the final where she was defeated by María Teresa Torró Flor. At the French Open, Čepelová lost in the second round of qualifying to Kateryna Bondarenko. At the Open Féminin de Marseille, she was defeated in the second round by sixth seed Denisa Allertová.

At the Nottingham Open, Čepelová's first grass-court tournament of the season, she lost in the first round of qualifying to Donna Vekić. At the Birmingham Classic, she was defeated in the first round of qualifying by Mariana Duque Mariño. Coming into Wimbledon ranked 106 in the world, Čepelová upset third seed Simona Halep in the first round. She lost in the second round to Monica Niculescu.

2016
At Wimbledon in 2016, Čepelová defeated Garbiñe Muguruza in the second round, her third top-three win, before losing to Lucie Šafářová in an epic three-set match.

2020
Beginning the season at the Australian Open, Čepelová withdrew from her first round of qualifying match against Kurumi Nara.

At the Qatar Ladies Open, she lost in the final round of qualifying to Jil Teichmann. Playing at the first edition of the Lyon Open, Čepelová was defeated in the first round of qualifying by Margot Yerolymos.

Grand Slam performance timeline

Singles

Notes

WTA career finals

Singles: 1 (runner–up)

ITF Circuit finals

Singles: 13 (7 titles, 6 runner–ups)

Doubles: 8 (3 titles, 5 runner–ups)

Junior Grand Slam finals

Girls' doubles: 1 (title)

Head-to-head record

No. 1 wins

Top 10 wins

References

External links

 
 
 
 
 
 
 

1993 births
Living people
Sportspeople from Košice
Slovak female tennis players
Australian Open (tennis) junior champions
Grand Slam (tennis) champions in girls' doubles
Tennis players at the 2010 Summer Youth Olympics
21st-century Slovak women